Areca glandiformis is a species of flowering plant in the family Arecaceae. It is found only in the Maluku Islands, Indonesia. It is threatened by habitat loss by increasing agriculture and forest management activities.

References

glandiformis
Endemic flora of the Maluku Islands
Data deficient plants
Taxonomy articles created by Polbot